Campoletis is a genus of parasitoid wasps belonging to the family Ichneumonidae.

The genus was first described by Förster in 1869.

The genus has cosmopolitan distribution.

Species:
 Campoletis agilis
 Campoletis annulata
 Campoletis latrator
Campoletis sonorensis
 Campoletis varians

References

Campopleginae
Ichneumonidae genera